John Brown  (22 September 1810 – 11 May 1882) was a Scottish physician and essayist known for his three-volume Horae Subsecivae (Leisure Hours, 1858), containing essays and papers on art, medical history and biography. Best remembered are his dog story "Rab and his Friends" (1859) and his essays "Pet Marjorie" (1863), on Marjorie Fleming, the ten-year-old prodigy and alleged "pet" of Walter Scott, "Our Dogs", "Minchmoor", and "The Enterkine". Brown was half-brother to the organic chemist Alexander Crum Brown.

Life

Brown was born in Biggar, Scotland, the son of Jane (née Nimmo) and clergyman John Brown (1784–1858). His mother died when he was six years old.

Brown, who was descended from eminent Presbyterian clergy, was educated at the Edinburgh High School. In 1833, he graduated with an MD from the University of Edinburgh, and practised as a physician in the city. After qualifying, he was apprenticed to James Syme. Brown subsequently acquired a large medical practice in Edinburgh at a time when infectious diseases took a heavy toll of life.

Brown's house at 23 Rutland Street was the scene of many social gatherings. In 1840 he married Catherine Scott McKay and together they had three children; a daughter who died shortly after birth, another daughter, Helen, who was to marry Captain Alexander Laws, and a son "Jock" Brown. Helen Laws moved to Ireland and outlived her father. However, Jock was to survive into the 20th century and worked hard to pay tribute to his father, collecting all his letters, and working to erect a plaque on his house which remains to this day. In 1847, Brown became a Fellow of the Royal College of Physicians of Edinburgh, and for a while was Honorary Librarian. He held strong views on the inappropriateness of examinations for evaluating student progress and was unimpressed by the view that scientific advances were in patients' best interests.

Brown was the friend of many contemporaries, including Thackeray and Mark Twain. His reputation is based on the two volumes of essays, Horae Subsecivae (Leisure Hours) (1858, 1861), John Leech and Other Papers (1882), Rab and His Friends (1859), and Marjorie Fleming: a Sketch (1863) (generally called Pet Marjorie). His first writing was in response to a request for contributions to the notices of paintings exhibited by the Royal Scottish Academy. The editor of the Scotsman newspaper then asked him to write regularly for the paper. He was 48 years old when he published Rab and His Friends. His writings were philosophical, classical, artistic, medical, of rural life, the Jacobite Rebellion, notable characters, humble folk and canine friends. These were published as a collection in 1858 as Horæ Subsecivæ, which ran to many editions. The first volume deals mainly with the equipment and duties of a physician, the second with subjects outside his profession.

Brown was revered and beloved to uncommon degree, and he was the cherished friend of many distinguished contemporaries, including Thackeray. Among those whose writing he encouraged was Henrietta Keddie, then a schoolgirl in Leith, who would become a prolific novelist and writer for children. In the mingling of tenderness and delicate humour, Brown has much in common with Lamb; in his insight into dog-nature he is unique. He wrote comparatively little; but all he wrote is good, some of it perfect of its kind.

Brown suffered during the latter years of his life from attacks of melancholy. He died at home at 23 Rutland Street in Edinburgh. on 11 May 1882, and was buried in his father's plot in New Calton Cemetery. The grave lies on the western side on the edge of one of the terraces. The inscription to Brown and the base and are largely obscured, but it is confirmed by his mother's name above.

Family
In 1840, Brown married Catherine Scott McKay (1819–1864).

Publications
The Life of Dr Henry Marshall
Pet Marjorie
The Little Book of Children

Memorials 
In 1923 a plaque was erected to Brown in the south-west corner of St Giles Cathedral in Edinburgh. It was sculpted by Pilkington Jackson.

References

Further reading

Martin Eastwood (2010),"John Brown (1810–1882)" Journal of the Royal College of Physicians of Edinburgh 40: pp. 281–282, 
E. T. McLaren (1890),Dr John Brown and his Sister Isabella (4th edition)
Letters of Dr John Brown, edited by his son and U.W. Forrest, with biography by ET McLaren (1907)
Alexander Peddie (1893), Recollections of Dr. John Brown Percival and Company, London, 

The Reader's Encyclopedia

External links

1810 births
1882 deaths
Scottish essayists
19th-century Scottish medical doctors
19th-century Scottish people
Fellows of the Royal Society of Edinburgh
People from Biggar, South Lanarkshire
Burials at the New Calton Burial Ground
People educated at the Royal High School, Edinburgh
Alumni of the University of Edinburgh
19th-century essayists